You Gotta Take a Little Love is an album by jazz pianist Horace Silver released on the Blue Note label in 1969, featuring performances by Silver with Randy Brecker, Bennie Maupin, John Williams, and Billy Cobham. The Allmusic review awarded the album 4 stars.

Track listing
All compositions by Horace Silver except as indicated

 "You Gotta Take a Little Love" - 5:24
 "The Risin' Sun" - 4:37
 "It's Time" - 6:42
 "Lovely's Daughter" (Bennie Maupin) - 4:14
 "Down and Out" - 4:30
 "The Belly Dancer" - 7:25
 "Brain Wave" - 6:14

Recorded on January 10 (1, 2, 4), and 17 (3, 5-7), 1969.

Personnel
Horace Silver - piano
Randy Brecker - trumpet, flugelhorn, except 4
Bennie Maupin - tenor saxophone, flute on 4, 6
John Williams - bass
Billy Cobham - drums

References

Horace Silver albums
1969 albums
Blue Note Records albums
Albums produced by Francis Wolff
Albums recorded at Van Gelder Studio